Claisebrook railway station is a railway station on the Transperth network. It is located on the Armadale/Thornlie line, Midland line and Airport line, 1.3 kilometres from Perth station serving the suburb of East Perth.

History
Opened in 1883 under the name East Perth, Claisebrook station is a busy junction along the Midland and Armadale/Thornlie lines due to both lines running through the station and the Claisebrook railway depot being next door.

The original railway station was built in timber with hardwood weatherboarding and external and timber lining. Rendered brick fireplaces were built in two of the rooms - possibly the waiting rooms and railway staff room and had very elegant rendered chimney caps providing a balance to the roof.

The Battye library carries the original plans and shows exposed heavy timber trussing of the roof which was very typical of the architecture of railway buildings of the era. The roofing was corrugated iron curved to provide a concave upper surface with the roof overhanging the tracks and providing cover to passengers leaving and arriving at the station.  As railway rolling stock grew taller the wide eaves and the timber trussing of the roof were trimmed back giving the roof a truncated appearance.

The station was located centrally between the east and west bound tracks and provided access to both.  In 1984 the station was relocated to Whiteman Park to be the Central Station on the light railway system under construction in the majority by the Western Australian Light Railway Preservation Association and the Metropolitan Region Planning Authority funded under Wage Pause and Community Employment Programmes.

In 1969, a new railway terminal was built 600 m away on the Midland line called East Perth, and caused this station to be renamed Claisebrook after a watercourse that is near the station. Between 2002 and 2003 the station was mostly rebuilt with new station structures, signage, platform finishes and a footbridge.

It has received Airport line services since 9 October 2022.

Platforms

The station saw 535,085 passengers in the 2013-14 financial year.

The following platforms are currently in use at Claisebrook:

Bus connections

Connections are available by Yellow CAT, which serves throughout East Perth, West Perth, and the City's centre corridor.

References

East Perth, Western Australia
Railway stations in Australia opened in 1883
Railway stations in Perth, Western Australia
Airport line, Perth